The Kalka–Barmer Express is an Express train belonging to North Western Railway zone that runs between  and  in India. It is currently being operated with 14887/14888 train numbers on a daily basis.

Service

The 14887/Kalka–Barmer Express has an average speed of 48 km/hr and covers 1081 km in 22h 45m. The 14888/Barmer–Kalka Express has an average speed of 47 km/hr and covers 1081 km in 23h 10m.

Route and halts 

The important halts of the train are:

Coach composition

The train has standard ICF rakes with max speed of 110 kmph. The train consists of 10 coaches:

 3 AC III Tier
 3 Sleeper coaches
 2 General Unreserved
 2 Seating cum Luggage Rake

Traction

Both trains are hauled by a Ghaziabad Loco Shed-based WAP-7 or WAP-5 electric locomotive from Kalka to Ambala. From Ambala hauled by a Bhagat Ki Kothi-based WDP-4D or WDP-4B diesel locomotive until Barmer and vice versa.

Rake sharing 
The Kalka–Barmer Express shares its rake with Barmar–Rishikesh Express till  from where the train reverses its direction to Kalka station.

Direction reversal

The train reverses its direction 1 times:

See also 

 Kalka railway station
 Barmer railway station

Notes

References

External links 

 14887/Kalka - Barmer Express
 14888/Barmer - Kalka Express

Transport in Kalka
Transport in Barmer, Rajasthan
Express trains in India
Rail transport in Punjab, India
Rail transport in Haryana
Rail transport in Chandigarh
Rail transport in Rajasthan
Railway services introduced in 2014